Richard Brush (born 26 November 1984) is an English professional footballer who plays as a goalkeeper for Irish side Sligo Rovers in the League of Ireland Premier Division.

Club career

Early career (2003–2006)
Brush started his career with Coventry City where after one year as an apprentice, he signed a three-year professional contract. Whilst at the club went out on loan to Tamworth in November 2003 with his loan spell being extended into a second, and then a third month. His time at Coventry included a wrist injury, which led to him missing an entire season. He moved to a month by month contract in June 2005, before parting ways with Coventry at the end of August 2005 when his contract expired.

He joined Shrewsbury Town, where he served as backup to a young Joe Hart. He played for the club's reserves and remained with the club, still without a contract.

In September 2005 he played for Stafford Rangers and in November 2005 he turned out for Hednesford Town making four appearances including making his debut in an FA Cup first round match against Histon.

He left Shrewsbury in January 2006. and next joined Nuneaton Borough

Sligo Rovers

First spell (2006–2011)
Brush's next move was to League of Ireland club Sligo Rovers where he made his League of Ireland debut against Shelbourne on 28 July 2006. He stayed with the club until 2011.

At Sligo, he broke his wrist.

Second spell (2012–2013)
Brush returned to Sligo in January 2012.

Third spell (2014–2016)
Brush signed back for the third time for the 2014 and 2015 season. These were difficult seasons for Sligo as their golden period was ending, despite a Setanta Cup win in 2014. At the end of the 2015 campaign, Brush departed the club for what seemed like the final time.

Fourth spell (2021–present)
On 1 February 2021, Brush signed again for Sligo Rovers.

Shamrock Rovers

First spell (2011–2012)
Brush was signed by Shamrock Rovers on 21 July 2011. He made his Rovers debut on 3 September 2011 against Dundalk helping them to a 2–1 victory.

He made two appearances in the 2011-12 UEFA Europa League as Rovers became the first Irish side to reach a European competition group stage.

Second spell (2013–2014)
Brush signed back for The Hoops in December 2012.

Finn Harps (2016–2017) 
In January 2016, Brush started training with newly promoted Finn Harps with a view to signing for the 2016 season. After joining the Ballybofey-based club, he made 19 league appearances.

Ballinamallard United (2017–2018)
In January 2017, Brush signed for Ballinamallard United on a free transfer taking the shirt number 30. He made his first appearance in the Irish Cup against Warrenpoint Town.

Cliftonville (2018–2021)
Brush signed for Cliftonville in July 2018, and played his first official match for the side on 4 August 2018 in a 2–1 win against Glentoran at the Oval.

Personal life
In November 2018, he suffered a stroke while driving.

Honours
Sligo Rovers
League of Ireland Premier Division (1): 2012
FAI Cup (1): 2010
League of Ireland Cup (1): 2010
Setanta Sports Cup (1): 2014

Shamrock Rovers
League of Ireland Premier Division (1): 2011
League of Ireland Cup (1): 2013
Setanta Sports Cup (1): 2013

References

External links

Living people
1984 births
English footballers
Association football goalkeepers
Coventry City F.C. players
Tamworth F.C. players
Stafford Rangers F.C. players
Shrewsbury Town F.C. players
Sligo Rovers F.C. players
Shamrock Rovers F.C. players
League of Ireland players
National League (English football) players
Expatriate association footballers in the Republic of Ireland
Nuneaton Borough F.C. players
Footballers from Birmingham, West Midlands
Hednesford Town F.C. players
Finn Harps F.C. players
Ballinamallard United F.C. players